Xylomoia indirecta, the oblique brocade moth, is a species of cutworm or dart moth in the family Noctuidae.

The MONA or Hodges number for Xylomoia indirecta is 9401.

References

Further reading

External links

 

Noctuinae
Articles created by Qbugbot
Moths described in 1875